Taylor Inlet is an inlet located in the Great Southern region of Western Australia.

The inlet is a wave dominated estuary with a degraded catchment that is a result of substantial clearing and a saline run-off.

The inlet is separated from the Southern Ocean by a sand bar and typically open once or twice a year for a few weeks at a time, usually between September and January. It is kidney shaped and lies almost parallel to the shoreline.

The vegetation fringing the inlet include Melaleuca cuticularis, Juncus kraussii, Samolus repens, Gahnia trifida and Baumea juncea. Other plants found in the surrounding dunes include sand spinifex, sword sedge and berry saltbush, pigface and peppermint trees.

References

Great Southern (Western Australia)
Estuaries of Western Australia
Inlets of Western Australia
South coast of Western Australia